Filipp Sergeyevich Oktyabrsky (real surname: Ivanov - Иванов;  – 8 July 1969, Sevastopol) was a Soviet naval commander. He began service in the Baltic Fleet in 1918.
From 1925–27 he studied at the Naval Academy in  Leningrad. As vice-admiral he was given command of the Black Sea Fleet in March 1939 and headed its actions during the Sieges of  Sevastopol (1941-1942) and  Odessa (1941). After the war he became a Deputy Commander-in-Chief of the Navy, commander of all naval test centres and from 1957 to 1960 head of the  Black Sea Higher Naval Institute "Admiral Pavel Nakhimov" in Sevastopol.

Awards and honors
 Hero of the Soviet Union
 Three Orders of Lenin
 Three Order of the Red Banner
 Two Order of Ushakov 1st class
 Order of Nakhimov 1st class
 Order of Suvorov 2nd class
 Order of the Red Star
 Medal "For the Defence of Odessa"
 Medal "For the Defence of Sevastopol"
 Commander of the Legion of Merit (USA)

A Kresta II class cruiser was named in honour of the Admiral.

References

Soviet admirals
Soviet military personnel of World War II
Heroes of the Soviet Union
Recipients of the Order of Lenin
Recipients of the Order of Ushakov, 1st class
Recipients of the Order of the Red Banner
Recipients of the Order of Nakhimov, 1st class
Recipients of the Order of Suvorov, 2nd class
Commanders of the Legion of Merit
People from Tver Oblast
1899 births
1969 deaths
Admirals of World War II